Heckroth is a surname. Notable people with the surname include:

Bill Heckroth (born 1949), American politician
Hein Heckroth (1901–1970), German art director